Synthopsis is a genus of very small sea snails, marine gastropod molluscs in the family Cerithiopsidae, the cerithids.

Species
Species within the genus Synthopsis include:

 Synthopsis acuminata Marshall, 1978
 Synthopsis albachiarae Cecalupo & Perugia, 2012
 Synthopsis albatros Cecalupo & Perugia, 2014 
 Synthopsis albostriata Cecalupo & Perugia, 2013
 Synthopsis ampulla Cecalupo & Perugia, 2012
 Synthopsis anelauensis Cecalupo & Perugia, 2018
 Synthopsis annachicchiae Cecalupo & Perugia, 2018
 Synthopsis attenuata Cecalupo & Perugia, 2012
 Synthopsis augurellii Cecalupo & Perugia, 2018
 Synthopsis battagliai Cecalupo & Perugia, 2012
 Synthopsis bicincta Cecalupo & Perugia, 2012
 Synthopsis bongiardinoi Cecalupo & Perugia, 2012
 Synthopsis byronensis Cecalupo & Perugia, 2018
 Synthopsis caelata (Powell, 1930)
 Synthopsis cancellata (Laseron, 1951)
 Synthopsis cebuensis Cecalupo & Perugia, 2012
 Synthopsis columnaLaseron, 1956
 Synthopsis cylindricaLaseron, 1956
 Synthopsis decorata Cecalupo & Perugia, 2012
 Synthopsis demissaLaseron, 1956
 Synthopsis dibellai Cecalupo & Perugia, 2019
 Synthopsis difficilis Cecalupo & Perugia, 2017
 Synthopsis eburnea Cecalupo & Perugia, 2014 
 Synthopsis elegans Cecalupo & Perugia, 2012
 Synthopsis eleonorae Cecalupo & Perugia, 2017
 Synthopsis enzae Cecalupo & Perugia, 2012
 Synthopsis exilis (Laseron, 1951)
 Synthopsis gratiosa Cecalupo & Perugia, 2012
 Synthopsis inedita Cecalupo & Perugia, 2012
 Synthopsis iohannae (Cecalupo & Perugia, 2012)
 Synthopsis lapernai Cecalupo & Perugia, 2014 
 Synthopsis laurae Cecalupo & Perugia, 2012
 Synthopsis lauta Cecalupo & Perugia, 2013
 Synthopsis limpida Cecalupo & Perugia, 2012
 Synthopsis lineata Cecalupo & Perugia, 2014
 Synthopsis lozoueti Cecalupo & Perugia, 2012
 Synthopsis maestratii Cecalupo & Perugia, 2012
 Synthopsis maioi Cecalupo & Perugia, 2021
 Synthopsis memorabilis Cecalupo & Perugia, 2012
 Synthopsis mirabilis Cecalupo & Perugia, 2012
 Synthopsis newirelandensis Cecalupo & Perugia, 2018
 Synthopsis noumeaensis Cecalupo & Perugia, 2017
 Synthopsis nusaensis Cecalupo & Perugia, 2018
 Synthopsis nutzeli Cecalupo & Perugia, 2012
 Synthopsis ouaoensis Cecalupo & Perugia, 2017
 Synthopsis panglaoensis Cecalupo & Perugia, 2012
 Synthopsis placaisae Cecalupo & Perugia, 2013
 Synthopsis plaziati Cecalupo & Perugia, 2012
 Synthopsis praeacuta Cecalupo & Perugia, 2012
 Synthopsis prima Cecalupo & Perugia, 2012
 Synthopsis producta Cecalupo & Perugia, 2012
 Synthopsis quadrii Cecalupo & Perugia, 2012
 Synthopsis querzolai Cecalupo & Perugia, 2013
 Synthopsis radixLaseron, 1956
 Synthopsis rapaensis Cecalupo & Perugia, 2014
 Synthopsis regia Marshall, 1978
 Synthopsis richeri Cecalupo & Perugia, 2017
 Synthopsis robbai Cecalupo & Perugia, 2012
 † Synthopsis ronquerollensis (Gougerot & Le Renard, 1981)
 Synthopsis russoi Cecalupo & Perugia, 2019
 Synthopsis sartorei Cecalupo & Perugia, 2012
 Synthopsis sebastianoi Cecalupo & Perugia, 2012
 Synthopsis serenae Cecalupo & Perugia, 2012
 Synthopsis shoujii Cecalupo & Perugia, 2019
 Synthopsis siarensis Cecalupo & Perugia, 2018
 Synthopsis silviae Cecalupo & Perugia, 2012
 Synthopsis similior Cecalupo & Perugia, 2013
 Synthopsis spadai Cecalupo & Perugia, 2017
 Synthopsis spectabilis Cecalupo & Perugia, 2012
 Synthopsis tongoensis Cecalupo & Perugia, 2016
 Synthopsis tumida Cecalupo & Perugia, 2012
 Synthopsis turgida Cecalupo & Perugia, 2012
 Synthopsis turritellata Cecalupo & Perugia, 2012
 Synthopsis uahucaensis Cecalupo & Perugia, 2021
 Synthopsis vallesi Cecalupo & Perugia, 2013
 Synthopsis vaurisi (Jay & Drivas, 2002)
 Synthopsis vavaiensis Cecalupo & Perugia, 2014
 Synthopsis vexillum Cecalupo & Perugia, 2016
 Synthopsis virgula (Laseron, 1951)

Synonyms
 Synthopsis adusta Cecalupo & Perugia, 2018: synonym of Costulopsis adusta (Cecalupo & Perugia, 2018) (original combination)
 Synthopsis ambigua Cecalupo & Perugia, 2013: synonym of Costulopsis ambigua (Cecalupo & Perugia, 2013) (original combination)
 Synthopsis hadfieldi (Jay & Drivas, 2002): synonym of Costulopsis hadfieldi (Jay & Drivas, 2002)
 Synthopsis impedita Cecalupo & Perugia, 2012: synonym of Costulopsis impedita (Cecalupo & Perugia, 2012)
 Synthopsis laguncula Cecalupo & Perugia, 2012: synonym of Joculator laguncula (Cecalupo & Perugia, 2012) (original combination)
 Synthopsis mactanensis Cecalupo & Perugia, 2012: synonym of Costulopsis mactanensis (Cecalupo & Perugia, 2012) (original combination)
 Synthopsis noninii Cecalupo & Perugia, 2012: synonym of Costulopsis noninii (Cecalupo & Perugia, 2012) (original combination)
 Synthopsis tenuicolorata Cecalupo & Perugia, 2012: synonym of Costulopsis tenuicolorata (Cecalupo & Perugia, 2012) (original combination)

References

Cerithiopsidae